The Blizzard is a 1921 American silent comedy film featuring Oliver Hardy.

Cast
 Jimmy Aubrey as The sleeper
 Oliver Hardy as Janitor (as Babe Hardy)
 Maude Emory as The girl/the mother
 Jack Lloyd as A tenant
 Vincent McDermott as Policeman

See also
 List of American films of 1921
 Oliver Hardy filmography

External links

1921 films
American silent short films
American black-and-white films
1921 comedy films
1921 short films
Films directed by Jess Robbins
Vitagraph Studios short films
Silent American comedy films
American comedy short films
1920s American films